The investing layer of deep cervical fascia is the most superficial part of the deep cervical fascia, and encloses the whole neck.

It is considered by some sources to be incomplete or nonexistent.

Attachments
It surrounds the neck like a collar, it splits around the sternocleidomastoid muscle and the trapezius muscle. It is attached as;

 Posteriorly - Ligamentum nuchae
 Anteriorly - Attached to the hyoid bone
 Superiorly - (from backwards to forwards);
 External occipital protuberance and Superior nuchal line of occipital bone
 Mastoid process of Temporal bone
  External acoustic meatus
 Lower margin of the zygomatic arch
 Lower border of body of mandible from the angle of mandible to the symphysis menti
 Inferiorly - (from backwards to forwards);
 Spine and acromial process of scapula
 Upper surface of the clavicle
Suprasternal notch of manubrium sterni

Tracings
 Horizontal extent - From ligamentum nuchae when traced forward, the fascia splits and encloses trapezius, reunites and form roof of posterior triangle of neck; again splits and encloses sternocleidomastoid, reunites and forms the roof of anterior triangle.
 Vertical extent - 
 Superior tracing - It splits and encloses submandibular gland and parotid gland;
  - It splits at lower border of submandibular gland into superficial and deep layers;which attach to lower body of body of mandible and mylohyoid line of mandible
  - It splits at lower pole of parotid gland into superficial and deep layers; superficial layer attaches to zygomatic arch and forms parotido-masseteric fascia after blending with masseter, deep layer attaches to tympanic plate and styloid process forming the stylomandibular ligament
 Inferior tracing - The fascia splits to enclose two spaces; suprasternal space and supraclavicular space

References

External links
 Sagittal Section Showing Deep Cervical Fascial Layers
 Infrahyoid Cross-Section Showing Layers of Deep Cervical Fascia
 Suprahyoid Cross-Section Showing Layers of Deep Cervical Fascia 

Fascial spaces of the head and neck